Management SOOP Corporation t/a Management SOOP is a South Korean actors agency that was established in 2011, and is currently operating as a subsidiary of Kakao Entertainment (a Kakao company). The roster includes actors Jeon Do-yeon, Gong Yoo, Gong Hyo-jin, Jung Yu-mi, Kim Jae-wook, Seo Hyun-jin, Choi Woo-shik, Nam Joo-hyuk, Bae Suzy,  Nam Ji-hyun  and  Kim Min-ju, among others.

History
Management SOOP was founded on April 19, 2011 by Kim Jang-kyun, who formerly worked for SidusHQ and Network of Asia (N.O.A) Entertainment (now Fantagio).

On June 27, 2018, Kakao M (now Kakao Entertainment) shared an update following reports that it was in talks to acquire entertainment agencies and created partnerships with three actor management agencies BH Entertainment, J.Wide Company, Management SOOP, and Korea’s leading advertisement model casting agency Ready Entertainment in order to globalize its content.

Artists

Actors
 Choi Woo-shik
 Gong Yoo
 Jang Sung-hoon
 Kim Jae-Uck
 Lee Chun-hee
 Nam Joo-hyuk
 Park Yeon-woo
 Jung Ga-ram

Actresses
 Bae Suzy
 Gong Hyo-jin
 Jeon Do-yeon
 Jeon So-nee
 Jung Yu-mi
 Kim Min-ju
 Kim Ji-su
 Nam Ji-hyun
 Seo Hyun-jin

Former artists
 Jung Il-woo
 Kim Min-hee
 Kim Tae-geum
 Lee Jae-joon
 Ryoo Seung-bum
 Soo Ae
 Yoo Min-kyu

References

External links
 
 
 

Talent agencies of South Korea
South Korean record labels
Entertainment companies established in 2011
Kakao subsidiaries
Kakao M